Protein tags are peptide sequences genetically grafted onto a recombinant protein.  Tags are attached to proteins for various purposes. They can be added to either end of the target protein, so they are either C-terminus or N-terminus specific or are both C-terminus and N-terminus specific. Some tags are also inserted at sites within the protein of interest; they are known as internal tags.

Affinity tags are appended to proteins so that they can be purified from their crude biological source using an affinity technique.  Affinity tags include chitin binding protein (CBP), maltose binding protein (MBP), Strep-tag and glutathione-S-transferase (GST).  The poly(His) tag is a widely used protein tag, which binds to matrices bearing immobilized metal ions.

Solubilization tags are used, especially for recombinant proteins expressed in species such as E. coli, to assist in the proper folding in proteins and keep them from aggregating in inclusion bodies.  These tags include thioredoxin (TRX) and poly(NANP).  Some affinity tags have a dual role as a solubilization agent, such as MBP and GST.

Chromatography tags are used to alter chromatographic properties of the protein to afford different resolution across a particular separation technique.  Often, these consist of polyanionic amino acids, such as FLAG-tag or polyglutamate tag.

Epitope tags are short peptide sequences which are chosen because high-affinity antibodies can be reliably produced in many different species.  These are usually derived from viral genes, which explain their high immunoreactivity.  Epitope tags include ALFA-tag, V5-tag, Myc-tag, HA-tag, Spot-tag, T7-tag and NE-tag. These tags are particularly useful for western blotting, immunofluorescence and immunoprecipitation experiments, although they also find use in antibody purification.

Fluorescence tags are used to give visual readout on a protein.  Green fluorescent protein (GFP) and its variants are the most commonly used fluorescence tags.  More advanced applications of GFP include using it as a folding reporter (fluorescent if folded, colorless if not).

Protein tags may allow specific enzymatic modification (such as biotinylation by biotin ligase) or chemical modification (such as coupling to other proteins through SpyCatcher or reaction with FlAsH-EDT2 for fluorescence imaging).  Often tags are combined, in order to connect proteins to multiple other components.  However, with the addition of each tag comes the risk that the native function of the protein may be compromised by interactions with the tag. Therefore, after purification, tags are sometimes removed by specific proteolysis (e.g. by TEV protease, Thrombin, Factor Xa or Enteropeptidase) or intein splicing.

List of protein tags 
(See Proteinogenic amino acid#Chemical properties for the A-Z amino-acid codes)

Peptide tags 
 ALFA-tag, a de novo designed helical peptide tag (SRLEEELRRRLTE) for biochemical and microscopy applications. The tag is recognized by a repertoire of single-domain antibodies 
 AviTag, a peptide allowing biotinylation by the enzyme BirA and so the protein can be isolated by streptavidin (GLNDIFEAQKIEWHE)
 C-tag, a peptide that binds to a single-domain camelid antibody developed through phage display (EPEA)
 Calmodulin-tag, a peptide bound by the protein calmodulin (KRRWKKNFIAVSAANRFKKISSSGAL)
 iCapTag™ (intein Capture Tag), peptide-based a self-removing tag controlled by pH change (MIKIATRKYLGKQNVYGIGVERDHNFALKNGFIAHN). Its patented component derived from Nostoc punctiforme (Npu) intein. This tag is used for protein purification of recombinant proteins and its fragments. It can be used in research labs and it is intended for large-scale purification during downstream manufacturing process as well. The iCapTag™-target protein complex can be expressed in a wide range of expression hosts (e.g. CHO and E.coli cells). It is not intended for fully expressed mAbs or membrane proteins
 polyglutamate tag, a peptide binding efficiently to anion-exchange resin such as Mono-Q (EEEEEE) 
 polyarginine tag, a peptide binding efficiently to cation-exchange resin (from 5 to 9 consecutive R)
 E-tag, a peptide recognized by an antibody (GAPVPYPDPLEPR)
 FLAG-tag, a peptide recognized by an antibody (DYKDDDDK)
 HA-tag, a peptide from hemagglutinin recognized by an antibody (YPYDVPDYA)
 His-tag, 5-10 histidines bound by a nickel or cobalt chelate (HHHHHH)
Gly-His-tags are N-terminal His-Tag variants (e.g. GHHHH, or GHHHHHH, or GSSHHHHHH) that still bind to immobilised metal cations but can also be activated via azidogluconoylation to enable click-chemistry applications 
 Myc-tag, a peptide derived from c-myc recognized by an antibody (EQKLISEEDL)
 NE-tag, an 18-amino-acid synthetic peptide (TKENPRSNQEESYDDNES) recognized by a monoclonal IgG1 antibody, which is useful in a wide spectrum of applications including Western blotting, ELISA, flow cytometry, immunocytochemistry, immunoprecipitation, and affinity purification of recombinant proteins 
Rho1D4-tag,  refers to the last 9 amino acids of the intracellular C-terminus of bovine rhodopsin (TETSQVAPA). It is a very specific tag that can be used for purification of membrane proteins.
 S-tag, a peptide derived from Ribonuclease A (KETAAAKFERQHMDS)
 SBP-tag, a peptide which binds to streptavidin (MDEKTTGWRGGHVVEGLAGELEQLRARLEHHPQGQREP)
 Softag 1, for mammalian expression (SLAELLNAGLGGS)
 Softag 3, for prokaryotic expression (TQDPSRVG)
 Spot-tag, a peptide recognized by a nanobody (PDRVRAVSHWSS) for immunoprecipitation, affinity purification, immunofluorescence and super resolution microscopy 
 Strep-tag, a peptide which binds to streptavidin or the modified streptavidin called streptactin (Strep-tag II: WSHPQFEK)
 T7-tag, an epitope tag derived from the T7 major capsid protein of the T7 gene (MASMTGGQQMG). Used in different immunoassays as well as affinity purification Mainly used 
 TC tag, a tetracysteine tag that is recognized by FlAsH and ReAsH biarsenical compounds (CCPGCC)
 Ty tag (EVHTNQDPLD)
 V5 tag, a peptide recognized by an antibody (GKPIPNPLLGLDST)
 VSV-tag, a peptide recognized by an antibody (YTDIEMNRLGK)
 Xpress tag (DLYDDDDK), a peptide recognized by an antibody

Covalent peptide tags 

 Isopeptag, a peptide which binds covalently to pilin-C protein (TDKDMTITFTNKKDAE)
 SpyTag, a peptide which binds covalently to SpyCatcher protein (AHIVMVDAYKPTK)
 SnoopTag, a peptide which binds covalently to SnoopCatcher protein (KLGDIEFIKVNK). A second generation, SnoopTagJr, was also developed to bind to either SnoopCatcher or DogTag (mediated by SnoopLigase) (KLGSIEFIKVNK)
 DogTag, a peptide which covalently binds to DogCatcher (DIPATYEFTDGKHYITNEPIPPK), and can also covalently bind to SnoopTagJr, mediated by SnoopLigase 
 SdyTag, a peptide which binds covalently to SdyCatcher protein (DPIVMIDNDKPIT). SdyTag/SdyCatcher has a kinetic-dependent cross-reactivity with SpyTag/SpyCatcher.

Protein tags 

 BCCP (Biotin Carboxyl Carrier Protein), a protein domain biotinylated by BirA enabling recognition by streptavidin
 Glutathione-S-transferase-tag, a protein which binds to immobilized glutathione
 Green fluorescent protein-tag, a protein which is spontaneously fluorescent and can be bound by nanobodies
 HaloTag, a mutated bacterial haloalkane dehalogenase that covalently attaches to haloalkane substrates
 SNAP-tag, a mutated eukaryotic DNA methyltransferase that covalently attaches to benzylguanine derivatives
 CLIP-tag, a mutated eukaryotic DNA methyltransferase that covalently attaches to benzylcytosine derivatives
HUH-tag, a sequence-specific single-stranded DNA binding protein that covalently binds to its target sequence
 Maltose binding protein-tag, a protein which binds to amylose agarose
 Nus-tag
 Thioredoxin-tag
 Fc-tag, derived from immunoglobulin Fc domain, allow dimerization and solubilization. Can be used for purification on Protein-A Sepharose
 Designed Intrinsically Disordered tags containing disorder promoting amino acids (P,E,S,T,A,Q,G,..)
 Carbohydrate Recognition Domain or CRDSAT-tag, a protein which binds to lactose agarose or Sepharose

Others 
HiBiT-tag
was developed by Scientists at Promega. It is an 11-amino-acid peptide tag, and it can be fused to the N- or C-terminus or internal locations of proteins. Its small size leads to a rapid knock-in of this tag with other proteins through CRISPR/Cas9 technology.

Applications
Affinity purification 
Protein array
TimeSTAMP protein labelling
Western blotting

References

Biochemical separation processes
Biochemistry detection methods
Laboratory techniques
Molecular biology techniques
Peptide sequences
Protein methods